The 1972 Titleholders Championship was contested from May 26–29 at Pine Needles Lodge and Golf Club in Southern Pines, North Carolina. It was the 28th and final edition of the Titleholders Championship, following a six-year hiatus. It was the only edition not played at the Augusta Country Club.

This event was won by Sandra Palmer.

Final leaderboard

External links

Spartanburg Herald-Journal source

Titleholders Championship
Golf in North Carolina
Titleholders Championship
Titleholders Championship
Titleholders Championship
Titleholders Championship
Women's sports in North Carolina